Caladenia formosa, commonly known as the large crimson spider orchid, or elegant spider orchid is a plant in the orchid family Orchidaceae and is endemic to Victoria and South Australia. It is a ground orchid with a single hairy leaf and a single crimson-coloured flower and which mainly occurs only in south-western Victoria.

Description
The sepals and petals taper to a long, thin tip which is densely covered with crowded glands and glandular hairs. There are four or six rows of long, red calli along the centre line of the labellum. Flowering occurs from September to October.

Taxonomy and naming
Caladenia formosa was first formally described by Geoffrey Carr in 1991 from a specimen collected in the Dergholm State Park. The description was published in Indigenous Flora and Fauna Association Miscellaneous Paper 1. The specific epithet (formosa) is a Latin word meaning “beautifully-formed” or "handsome".

Distribution and habitat
The large crimson spider orchid grows among shrubs or grass in forest and woodland in well-drained soil. It is only known from areas between Cavendish, Penola, Kingston SE and Keith although it probably had a wider distribution in the past.

Conservation
Caladenia formosa is listed as  "vulnerable" under the Victorian Government Flora and Fauna Guarantee Act 1988 and the Australian Government Environment Protection and Biodiversity Conservation Act 1999. In 2010 the population of this orchid was estimated to comprise 450 individual plants in fourteen populations. The main threats to the species are weed invasion and habitat loss or degradation due to land clearing, rubbish dumping and grazing by rabbits and cattle.

References

formosa
Plants described in 1991
Endemic orchids of Australia
Orchids of Victoria (Australia)